Din Sula (born 2 March 1998) is a footballer who plays as a forward for Belgian side Knokke, on loan from Virton. Born in Belgium, Sula represents Albania internationally.

Career
Sula played his first official match for OHL in June 2015 during the 2015 Belgian Second Division play-offs when he came on as a substitute in a 0-0 draw at home to Lierse. Half a year later on 21 November 2015, he played his first match in the Belgian Pro League when he was in the starting lineup at home against Genk.

Personal life
Sula is of Kosovan Albanian descent, and his brother Drin is also a footballer who actually plays for K. Rupel Boom F.C.

References

External links
 Din Sula at Footballdatabase
 
 

1998 births
Living people
Albanian footballers
Albania under-21 international footballers
Belgian footballers
Belgium youth international footballers
Belgian people of Kosovan descent
Belgian people of Albanian descent
Oud-Heverlee Leuven players
Lommel S.K. players
S.K. Beveren players
R.E. Virton players
K. Patro Eisden Maasmechelen players
Belgian Pro League players
Challenger Pro League players
Footballers from Brussels
Association football forwards